USK Praha, (University Sports Club Prague), formerly known as Slavia VŠ Praha, is a Czech professional basketball club that was founded in 1953 in the city of Prague. USK Praha plays in the NBL, the highest competition in the Czech Republic.

It is a 14-times national champion. USK Praha became the first and so far the only men's basketball club in Czech Republic, as well as former Czechoslovakia, to win one of the European cup competitions, the FIBA Cup Winners' Cup in 1969.

History

The club won the 2nd tier FIBA European Cup Winners' Cup in the 1968–69 season, only a year after losing the same title in the final game of the 1967–68 season against AEK. Slavia also reached the FIBA European Champions Cup Final during the 1965–66 season, where they lost to Simmenthal Milano.

Honours
Total titles: 15

Domestic competitions
 Czech League
 Winners (3): 1993, 1999–00, 2000–01
 Runners-up (3): 1995–96, 1996–97, 1998–99
 Czech Republic Cup
 Runners-up (3): 1995–96, 2000–01, 2019–20
 Czechoslovak League (defunct)
 Winners (11): 1964–65, 1965–66, 1968–69, 1969–70, 1970–71, 1971–72, 1973–74, 1980–81, 1981–82, 1990–91, 1991–92
 Runners-up (8): 1962–63, 1963–64, 1966–67, 1967–68, 1972–73, 1975–76, 1976–77, 1992–93

European competitions
 EuroLeague
 Runners-up (1): 1965–66
 3rd place (1): 1966–67
 Semifinalists (2): 1969–70, 1970–71
 Final Four (2): 1966, 1967
 FIBA Saporta Cup (defunct)
 Winners (1): 1968–69
 Runners-up (1): 1967–68

Worldwide competitions
 FIBA Intercontinental Cup
 4th place (1): 1970

International record

The road to the 1968–69 FIBA European Cup Winners' Cup victory

Current roster

Notable players
- Set a club record or won an individual award as a professional player.
- Played at least one official international match for his senior national team at any time.
  Tomáš Satoranský
  Vlastibor Klimeš
  Alexander Madsen
  Ondřej Sehnal

See also
USK Praha (women's basketball)

References

External links
Official Site 
Eurobasket.com USK Praha Page

SK Slavia Prague
Sport in Prague
Basketball teams in the Czech Republic
Basketball teams established in 1953
Basketball in Czechoslovakia
1953 establishments in Czechoslovakia